Majidabad (also Romanized as Majīdābād) is a village in Yurchi-ye Gharbi Rural District, Kuraim District, Nir County, Ardabil Province, Iran. At the 2006 census, its population was 402, in 71 families.

References 

Towns and villages in Nir County